The black-throated spinetail (Synallaxis castanea) is a species of bird in the family Furnariidae. It is found in the Venezuelan Coastal Range.

Its natural habitats are subtropical or tropical moist montane forests and heavily degraded former forest.

References

black-throated spinetail
Birds of the Venezuelan Coastal Range
Endemic birds of Venezuela
black-throated spinetail
black-throated spinetail
Taxonomy articles created by Polbot